Anshe Chesed Fairmount Temple is a Reform Jewish temple in Beachwood, Ohio, the oldest existing Jewish congregation in the Cleveland area.  The name Anshe Chesed is Hebrew for "People of Loving Kindness".
The congregation's membership exceeded 2,000 families in the mid-1990s.

The synagogue is a member of the Union for Reform Judaism.

History
In 1841, the congregation was established as a German Orthodox synagogue. On February 28, 1842, the synagogue was chartered as a part of Anshe Chesed.

In 1845, the Israelitic Anshe Chesed Society was formed when the Israelite Society (part of the original congregation) merged with Anshe Chesed.

In 1846, the congregation built Cleveland's first synagogue on Eagle Street, now where Progressive Field is located.

In 1887, the congregation moved out of downtown toward the then newly built neighborhoods on the east side of Cleveland along with the rest of the Jewish community of Cleveland, and dedicated its second building on East 25th Street and Scovill Avenue.

In 1912, the congregation moved further east when it built a new synagogue on East 82nd Street and Euclid Avenue. The mammoth synagogue became known as the Euclid Avenue Temple.

In the mid-1800s it became a member of the Union of American Hebrew Congregations for two years, then left, to rejoin in 1907 and adopt the Union Prayer Book when Louis Wolsey, its first American-born American-educated rabbi became its spiritual leader. Wolsey led the congregation from 1907 to 1924. Barnett R. Brickner was rabbi of the congregation from 1925 until his death in 1953.

The Beachwood Zoning and Antisemitism Conflict of 1948-1957 
In 1948, a heated village wide debate was sparked in Beachwood after the proposal of the construction of the Anshe Chesed Fairmount Temple following the purchase of 32 acres of land on which the temple currently stands. The debate was started due to the rapidly growing popular trend of families moving to the suburbs due to the booming post WWII economy. Considering that Beachwood at the time was a relatively small community with few Jews, the sudden proposal of the large synagogue of 1,800 families sparked anti-Semitic worries among the village's community due to the imminent demographics change that the establishment of a large synagogue would bring. The village council, no member of which was Jewish, cited in 1952 that the establishment of Anshe Chesed "would be detrimental to the public safety, welfare, and convenience of the village". One morning in May 1952, following Anshe Chesed's threat to sue the village of Beachwood, residents opened their mailboxes and found a white supremacist newspaper called The Plain Truth, with the message:

"The battle is on. No longer should we sit idly by and watch our country be taken from us. Act now. Let not the Jew plan succeed".

Zoning arguments between the village and the congregation regarding the temple's construction sparked an Ohio Supreme Court Case which ruled in 1954 that the synagogue must be allowed to be built, as well as with issuing state building permits to the congregation. The temple's construction was finished in 1957.

In 1957, the Fairmount Temple, Anshe Chesed's present home, was dedicated. In 1958, Rabbi Arthur Lelyveld, former national director of B'nai B'rith Hillel Foundation was hired.

The current clergy team consists of Senior Rabbi Robert A. Nosanchuk, Rabbi Joshua L. Caruso, Associate Rabbi Elle Muhlbaum, Cantor Vladimir Lapin, and Cantor Laureate Sarah Sager

Notable members 
David Mark Berger, American-born Israeli Olympic weightlifter who was killed during the Munich massacre at the 1972 Summer Olympics.
Brad Goldberg, major league baseball pitcher, became bar mitzvah at Anshe Chesed Fairmount Temple.
Howard Metzenbaum, the only Jewish Senator from Ohio.
 Rebecca Alison Meyer, who died of cancer at age 6 and was daughter of web design consultant and author Eric A. Meyer. The hex color #663399  was named "rebeccapurple" and added to the CSS color list in her memory.

References

External links

Buildings and structures in Cuyahoga County, Ohio
Beachwood, Ohio
German-American culture in Ohio
Reform synagogues in Ohio